Turritriton is a genus of medium-sized sea snails, marine gastropod molluscs in the family Cymatiidae. This is often still regarded merely as a subgenus of the genus Cymatium.

Description
(Description as Tritoniscus) Forms with subturbinate body with flat-topped turriculate whorls, a short spire and siphonal canal, subumbilicate, with a single large and heavy terminal varix and narrow callus on the body.

Distribution
This genus occurs in tropical and subtropical Indo-Pacific Oceans, western America, and the Caribbean Sea.

Species
The genus Turritriton contains the following species:
 Turritriton fittkaui (Parth, 1991)
 Turritriton gibbosus (Broderip, 1833) - type species
 † Turritriton grundensis (R. Hoernes & Auinger, 1884) 
 Turritriton kobelti (Von Maltzan, 1884)
 Turritriton labiosus (Wood, 1828)
 Turritriton pharcida (Dall, 1889)
 Turritriton tenuiliratus (Lischke, 1873)

References

External links
 Iredale, T. (1936). Australian molluscan notes, no. 2. Records of the Australian Museum. 19(5): 267-340, pls 20-24
 Powell A W B, New Zealand Mollusca, William Collins Publishers Ltd, Auckland, New Zealand 1979 

Cymatiidae